The Bougainville People's Alliance Party (BPAP) is a Bougainvillean political party founded by Ishmael Toroama in 2019. In the 2020 Bougainville Presidential Election, Toroama the BPAP candidate, won the presidential election.

References

Autonomous Region of Bougainville